Judith Craig is a retired American bishop of the United Methodist Church, whose primary field of service was the United States.

She was born on 5 June 1937 in Lexington, Missouri and elected bishop in 1984.She died on January 18, 2019.

Education
She graduated (B.A.) from William Jewell College.  She completed an M.Div. degree at Eden Theological Seminary in 1961, and an M.A. in Christian Education from Union Theological Seminary in New York City, New York in 1968.

Ordained ministry
Craig was ordained to the ministry of the United Methodist Church at the East Ohio Annual Conference, as a deacon in 1972 and as an elder in 1974, both ordinations by Bishop Francis Enmer Kearns. She was appointed Minister of Religious Education (later Associate Minister) of the Epworth-Euclid U.M. Church (1972–76).  From 1976 to 1980 Craig was the Pastor of the Pleasant Hills U.M. Church. In 1980 Craig was appointed the Director of the East Ohio Conference Council on Ministries.

Craig was elected a delegate to the 1980 and 1984 General and North Central Jurisdictional Conferences of the U.M. Church, in 1980 also serving as the Secretary of the Legislative Committee on Higher Education and Ministry of the General Conference.

Episcopal ministry
The North Central Jurisdictional Conference elected Craig a bishop in 1984. She was assigned to the Michigan Area, 1984-92. In 1992 she was assigned the Ohio West Area, from which she retired in 2000.  

As a bishop, Craig served on the United Methodist General Commission on the Status and Role of Women (1984–88), the U.M. General Council on Ministries (1988–92), and the General Board of Publication.  Bishop Craig received an honorary Doctor of Humane Letters from Baldwin-Wallace College in 1979, another from Adrian College in 1985, a Doctor of Divinity degree from Otterbein College in 1994, and another D.D. from Lebanon Valley College (also 1994).  In 1996 she was honored to be selected by her colleagues on the U.M. Council of Bishops to deliver the Episcopal Address at General Conference.

In retirement, Bishop Craig has served as the Bishop in Residence and a Visiting Professor of Leadership at the Methodist Theological School in Ohio.

Works
 The Leading Women: Stories of the First Women Bishops of the United Methodist Church (editor)

See also
List of bishops of the United Methodist Church

References
InfoServ, the official information service of The United Methodist Church.  
The Council of Bishops of the United Methodist Church

External links
Photo of Bishop Craig

Living people
William Jewell College alumni
Otterbein University alumni
1937 births
Women Methodist bishops
American feminists
United Methodist bishops of the North Central Jurisdiction